Ray G. Steiner is a retired American basketball player, best known for his All-American college career at Saint Louis University.

Stenier, a 5'11" point guard from Bland, Missouri, started at the University of Missouri, then transferred to Moberly Area Community College in the 1949–50 season, leading the Greyhounds to the 1950 junior college state title.  From there, Steiner transferred to Saint Louis for his final two seasons of eligibility.

After placing on the All-Missouri Valley Conference (MVC) second team as a junior, Steiner stepped up his game in his senior season.  He drew acclaim in the regular season as he sparked the Billikens to a 61–60 win over top-ranked Kentucky in the Sugar Bowl Classic.  He led SLU to the school's first NCAA tournament berth and at the conclusion of the season was named unanimously to the All-MVC first team and placed on the AP and UPI third All-America teams.

Following his graduation from SLU, Steiner was drafted by the Rochester Royals in the 1952 NBA draft.  Instead he chose to play for the Phillips 66ers in the Amateur Athletic Union.  After his playing days were over, he remained with Phillips Petroleum Company.

References

Date of birth missing (living people)
Living people
All-American college men's basketball players
Basketball players from Missouri
Moberly Greyhounds baseball players
Moberly Greyhounds men's basketball players
People from Bland, Missouri
Phillips 66ers players
Point guards
Rochester Royals draft picks
Saint Louis Billikens men's basketball players
American men's basketball players
Year of birth missing (living people)